Hadromyia is a genus of hoverflies in the family Syrphidae. There are about seven described species in Hadromyia.

Species
Subgenus Chrysosomidia Curran, 1934
H. aepalius (Walker, 1849)
H. aldrichi (Shannon, 1916)
H. cimbiciformis (Portschinsky, 1879)
H. crawfordi (Shannon, 1916)
H. opaca (Shannon, 1916)
H. pulchra (Williston, 1882)
Subgenus Hadromyia (Williston, 1882)
H. grandis Williston, 1882

References

Eristalinae
Diptera of North America
Diptera of Asia
Hoverfly genera
Taxa named by Samuel Wendell Williston